Glamorgan, also known as Kittery Hill, is a large Queen Anne style house in Deer Park, Garrett County, Maryland.  It is a large -story frame building built in 1888, as a summer house.

It was listed on the National Register of Historic Places in 1984.

References

External links
, including photo in 1981, at Maryland Historical Trust.

Houses in Garrett County, Maryland
Houses on the National Register of Historic Places in Maryland
Queen Anne architecture in Maryland
Houses completed in 1888
National Register of Historic Places in Garrett County, Maryland